Milan "Minja" Subota (8 November 1938 – 17 September 2021) was a Serbian composer, musician, entertainer and photographer, born in Sarajevo. He was the host of the long-running children's TV show Muzički tobogan on RTS (formerly on TV Novi Sad). In 2021, he was awarded the Order of Karađorđe's Star.

Discography

Albums

Pop music albums
 Milan Subota (Melodiya, USSR D28485–6)
 Budi dobar prema njoj

Children's music albums
 Minja Subota and Ljubivoje Ršumović: Minja i Ršum (PGP RTB LP 66 6111)
 Pesme za decu (PGP RTB 2140322 STEREO)
 Dragan Laković and Minja Subota: Najlepše dečje pesme (PGP RTB 2140527)
 Minja Subota and Zlata Petković: Plavi čuperak (PGP RTB LP 6123 STEREO)
 Pesme iz Muzičkog tobogana (PGP RTB 2140470 STEREO)
 Deca su ukras sveta (PGP RTS CD 450082 STEREO)

EPs

Pop music EPs
 Milan Subota (Jugoton – EPY 3229)
 Milan Subota (PGP RTB EP 50217)
 Milan Subota (PGP RTB EP 50215)
 Milan Subota (PGP RTB EP 50216)
 Milan Subota (PGP RTB EP 50317)
 Lola Jovanović i Milan Subota (PGP RTB EP 50332)

Children's music EPs
 Telefonijada (PGP RTB EP 61042)
 Minja Subota and Kolibri Choir: Ečke tečke (PGP RTB EP 61047)
 Šansone (PGP RTB EP 50 394)
 One i oni – Aždaja svome čedu tepa (PGP RTB EP – 61043)

Books
 "Kako smo zabavljali Tita"

Notes and references

External links

 Official web site

1938 births
2021 deaths
Musicians from Sarajevo
Serbs of Bosnia and Herzegovina
Serbian television personalities
Serbian composers
Burials at Belgrade New Cemetery